Levi Rackliffe (c. 1843 – April 21, 1898) served as California State Treasurer from 1895 until his death. He was born in Lincolnville, Maine and died in Sacramento, California, at around age 55. He is interred in the Sacramento Historic City Cemetery.

Resources

Levi Rackliffe entry at Genealogy.com

State treasurers of California
1898 deaths
Year of birth uncertain
California Republicans
People from Lincolnville, Maine